The 2017–18 Spartan South Midlands Football League season was the 21st in the history of Spartan South Midlands Football League, a football competition in England.

The constitution for Step 5 and Step 6 divisions for 2017–18 was announced on 26 May 2017. Following a few amendments, the constitution for the Spartan South Midlands League was ratified at the league's AGM on 24 June 2017.

Premier Division

The Premier Division featured 20 clubs which competed in the division last season, along with two clubs, promoted from Division One: 
Biggleswade
Harpenden Town

League table

Division One

Division One featured 20 clubs in the division for this season, of which there are five new clubs:
 Enfield Borough, promoted from Division Two
 FC Broxbourne Borough, relegated from the Premier Division
 Maccabi London Lions, promoted from the Herts County League
 Rayners Lane, transferred from the Hellenic League
 St Neots Town reserves, promoted from Division Two

League table

Division Two

Division Two featured 14 clubs which competed in the division last season, along with three new clubs:
AFC Southgate
Berkhamsted Raiders, joined from the Herts County League
Park View, joined from the Amateur Football Combination

League table

References

2017-18
9